Eastwood Local School District is a school district in Northwest Ohio. The school district serves students who live primarily in and around the villages of Luckey and Pemberville, in Wood County. The superintendent is Brent Welker.

Grades 9-12
Eastwood High School

Grades 6-8
Eastwood Middle School

Grades K-5
Eastwood Elementary School

External links
 

School districts in Wood County, Ohio